Timothy Thomas Ryan (born September 2, 1968) is a former American football offensive lineman who played for the Tampa Bay Buccaneers in the National Football League.

Ryan was born on September 2, 1968, in Kansas City, Missouri.  He attended Rockhurst High School, where, in 1986, he won the Simone Award for the best high school football player in the Kansas City Metropolitan Area.  After Ryan graduated from Rockhurst, he went on to play college football for Notre Dame Fighting Irish football.  At 6'2" and 280 pounds, Ryan would graduate Notre Dame and play for the Tampa Bay Buccaneers from 1991–1993.

1968 births
Living people
Players of American football from Kansas City, Missouri
American football offensive linemen
Notre Dame Fighting Irish football players
Tampa Bay Buccaneers players